John M. Sides is an American political scientist.

He graduated from the University of North Carolina at Chapel Hill in 1996, and pursued a doctorate at the University of California, Berkeley. Sides then began his teaching career as an assistant professor at the University of Texas at Austin. He subsequently joined the George Washington University faculty, then was appointed William R. Kenan, Jr. Chair and Professor at Vanderbilt University.

Sides cofounded The Monkey Cage, a blog, in 2007.

Selected publications

References

University of Texas at Austin faculty
University of North Carolina at Chapel Hill alumni
George Washington University faculty
Living people
American political scientists
University of California, Berkeley alumni
Vanderbilt University faculty
21st-century American scientists
21st-century American male writers
American bloggers
American male bloggers
The New York Times writers
The Washington Post people
Year of birth missing (living people)